Lake Charlevoix is a lake in Charlevoix County in the U.S. state of Michigan.

The lake's largest tributaries are the Jordan River, feeding into the south arm at East Jordan, and the Boyne River, flowing into the main basin from the east at Boyne City. Other significant tributaries include Horton, Stover, Porter, and Loeb Creeks. The outflow of Lake Charlevoix is the short Round Lake/Pine River complex which discharges into Lake Michigan at Charlevoix.

The lake occupies portions of Charlevoix Township, Marion Township, Hayes Township, Eveline Township, Michigan, Bay Township, and Evangeline Township.

Young State Park is located on the shore of the lake just northwest of Boyne City. The Ironton Ferry at Ironton, a designated Michigan Historical Site in operation since 1876, crosses the south arm where it branches off from the main basin, saving about 20 minutes of driving time around the south arm by the shoreline route.

The lake was also known previously as Pine Lake and Long Lake. It was renamed from "Pine Lake" to its current name ("Lake Charlevoix") in 1926.

See also
List of lakes in Michigan

References

External links

Lake Charlevoix and its watershed
 

Charlevoix
Charlevoix
Tributaries of Lake Michigan